The Egyptian Renaissance Party, also known as the Revival Party, is a Salafist political party. However, it has also been reported to be in favor of a civil state. The leader of the party, Ibrahim Al-Zafaraany, stated that the party would focus on education and "scientific research" as well as the economy. Al-Zafaraany is a former member of al-Gama'a al-Islamiyya.

The party was founded by former members of the Muslim Brotherhood. The founder of the party is Mohammed Habib.

In the Qandil Cabinet, one minister was a member of the Renaissance Party. The party has stated in September 2012 that it and the Virtue Party would merge.

References

2011 establishments in Egypt
Conservative parties in Egypt
Islamic political parties in Egypt
Political parties established in 2011
Political parties in Egypt
Salafi groups
Sunni Islamic political parties